Pierre Bordage (born 29 January 1955 in La Réorthe, Vendée) is a French science fiction author. He won the Cosmos 2000 prize in 1996 for his novel La Citadelle Hyponéros.

Pierre Bordage is one of France's best-selling science fiction writers. With more than 20 novels published in just over a decade, his books often touch on the spiritual aspects of society, in a style that combines the best of classic adventure stories with reflection on the future and the present.

Bordage's books are best-sellers in France, and have been translated in several European countries (Russia, Italia, Spain, Slovenia, Romania...) but there still remains the difficulty of getting published in English, especially in the United States.

He was winner of the 2008 Cezam Prix Littéraire Inter CE for Porteur d’âmes.

He was influenced by Philip José Farmer, Robert A. Heinlein, Frank Herbert, Orson Scott Card, and Star Wars.

Bibliography

Rohel le conquérant
Rohel the conqueror 1992-1996

Dame Asmine d'Alba cycle
Le Chêne Vénérable
Les maîtres sonneurs
Le monde des franges
Lune noire
Asmine d'Alba
Lucifal cycle
Les anges du fer
Le grand fleuve-temps
L'enfant à la main d'homme
Les portes de Babûlon
Lucifal
Saphir cycle
Terre intérieure
Les feux de Tarphagène
Le choeur du vent
Saphyr d'Antiter

Les guerriers du silence
(The Warriors of Silence) 1993-1998 Translated into English by Galatea Maman

Les guerriers du silence
Terra Mater
La citadelle Hyponéros

Wang series
1996-1997

Les portes d'occident (The Gates of The Occident)
Les aigles d'orient

Other novels
Abzalon (1998)
Atlantis, les fils du rayon d'or (1998)
Orchéron (2000)
 "Les Fables de l'Humpur"
 "L'evangile du Serpent"

L'enjômineur
1792
1793
1794

Les derniers hommes (the last men) (2000) 
A near future, after the third world war. In a Europe devastated by chemical, nuclear and genetic pollution, the rare intact resources are shared between nomadic tribes who have taken charge of the exploitation of a specific element. Solman the lame man from the Aquarius tribe – who discovers and controls water sources – has a gift of clairvoyance: this gift puts him apart from everybody, as people do not trust him. Except the healer Raima, the mysterious kadija and an old scientist of the old world who accompany him on his quest to escape the apocalypse which seems to menace the last men.

La Fraternité du Panca
Frère Ewen(2007)
Soeur Ysolde (2008)
Frère Kalkin (2010)
Soeur Onden (2011)
Frère Elthor (2012)

References

External links

Pierre Bordage's personal site (French language)

1955 births
Living people
People from Vendée
French science fiction writers
French fantasy writers
French male novelists